Adaghan (also Romanized as Ādāghān) is a village in Chaybasar-e Jonubi Rural District of the Central District of Maku County, West Azerbaijan province, Iran. At the 2006 National Census, its population was 1,043 in 198 households. The following census in 2011 counted 1,023 people in 242 households. The latest census in 2016 showed a population of 1,162 people in 298 households; it was the largest village in its rural district.

References 

Maku County

Populated places in West Azerbaijan Province

Populated places in Maku County